Dighton is a town in Bristol County, Massachusetts, United States. The population was 8,101 at the 2020 census. The town is located on the western shore of the Taunton River in the southeastern part of the state.

History

Crossroads

Dighton's location has long made it a crossroads for travel The "Old Bristol Path" took early settlers from the Pilgrim settlement in Plymouth, Massachusetts to Bristol, Rhode Island, the home of Massasoit. A ferry took travelers across the Taunton River. Later, a stage coach ran through Dighton, connecting Taunton and Bristol. Dighton was also along the route between Fall River and Taunton.

Origin
Dighton was originally part of Taunton's South Purchase and other surrounding towns. It was separated in 1672, officially incorporated in 1712. It was named for Frances Dighton Williams, wife of Richard Williams, a town elder.  At the time of incorporation, the town included land on both sides of the Taunton River, including the land of Assonet Neck, which includes Dighton Rock, a rock found in the shallows of the river which includes cryptic carvings whose origins are debated to this day.  However, in 1799, that land on the east bank of the river was annexed by Berkley, thus giving that town the claim of being the home of the rock.

Molasses Affair
In 1765, shortly after the renewal of the Molasses Act, Dighton's wharves were the site of the "Molasses Affair," a protest of British taxes on molasses similar to the more famous Boston Tea Party. A local ship reported a cargo of 63 casks of molasses to the British custom officials, but the ship actually contained double that number. The customs official ordered the ship's cargo impounded while he departed for Newport for assistance. While he was gone, forty local men with blackened faces stole the cargo, ran the ship aground, and drilled holes in the hull to protest British tax policies.

Revolution
During the time of the American Revolutionary War, Dighton gave refuge to several refugees from Newport, Rhode Island who had fled the British occupation there. These included Ezra Stiles and William Ellery. Stiles kept a diary of his time in Dighton. In January 1778 the town council voted in favor of the Articles of Confederation.

Industries

As it was located at the beginning of the tidewater of the river, Dighton was a shipbuilding community, and even had status as a port of call. North of Dighton the Taunton River becomes too shallow for ships to navigate, and this, along with its centralized location, allowed Dighton to become a shipping hub for southeastern Massachusetts.  In 1789 Dighton was made a port of entry for the surrounding towns. Ships would unload in Dighton and goods were either transferred to smaller boats or towed by oxen along a tow path on the east side of the river to Taunton.

Herring were plentiful in the Taunton River, and at one point Dighton's herring fishery provided more income to the town than any other industry. Fish were preserved in salt and exported as far away as the West Indies.

Shipbuilding started in Dighton as early as 1698. Thomas Coram built Dighton's first shipyard on the west side of the Taunton River. Shipbuilding grew into a significant industry after 1800, peaking around 1850.  During 1840–1845 twenty-two schooners, two sloops, four brigs, and three barks were built in Dighton.

There were also cotton mills, paper mills, manufacturers and farming concerns in the town. From before the Civil War to at least 1912, the town was regionally known for its strawberry farms. With time, however, many of these industries left, leaving the town as a rural suburban community with some small farms.

Tricentennial
In 2012, Dighton celebrated its Tricentennial with town selectmen donning historic costumes and crossing the Taunton River to Ferry Landing. Afterwards they held a ceremony at Founders Hall.

Geography

Dighton is bordered by Rehoboth to the west, Swansea to the southwest, Somerset to the south, the Taunton River and the town of Berkley to the east, and the city of Taunton to the north. In addition to being bordered by the Taunton River, it also is bordered by the Three Mile River, a tributary which empties into the Taunton along the northeast border of town. The town is also crossed by the Segreganset River, another tributary of the Taunton which flows through the center of town, as well as several smaller brooks.

Dighton is the site of the Berkley–Dighton Bridge, originally a one-lane bridge built in the 1890s as a link between Center Street in Dighton and Elm Street in Berkley. In 2010, the old bridge was demolished and a temporary bridge handled traffic as a new bridge was built. In August 2015 a new two-lane bridge opened to traffic.

Dighton's localities are Chestnut Tree Corner, Dighton, Dighton Rock State Park, North Dighton, Segreganset, South Dighton and Wheeler's Corner.

Demographics

As of the census of 2000, there were 6,175 people, 2,201 households, and 1,718 families residing in the town. The racial makeup of the town was 97.80% White, 0.53% African American, 0.19% Native American, 0.49% Asian, 0.02% Pacific Islander, 0.28% from other races, and 0.70% from two or more races. Hispanic or Latino of any race were 1.07% of the population.

There were 2,201 households, out of which 37.4% had children under the age of 18 living with them, 64.5% were married couples living together, 9.9% had a female householder with no husband present, and 21.9% were non-families. 18.8% of all households were made up of individuals, and 9.7% had someone living alone who was 65 years of age or older.  The average household size was 2.78 and the average family size was 3.17.

In the town, the population was spread out, with 26.1% under the age of 18, 6.3% from 18 to 24, 30.4% from 25 to 44, 24.3% from 45 to 64, and 12.8% who were 65 years of age or older.  The median age was 38 years. For every 100 females, there were 96.8 males.  For every 100 females age 18 and over, there were 92.4 males.

The median income for a household in the town was $58,600, and the median income for a family was $64,792. Males had a median income of $41,427 versus $28,250 for females. The per capita income for the town was $22,600.  About 1.0% of families and 2.6% of the population were below the poverty line, including 3.8% of those under age 18 and 1.2% of those age 65 or over.

Arts and culture

Annual cultural events
Dighton is home of the Cow Chip Festival. The Dighton Lions Club hosts the event. Every June a traveling carnival comes and sets up behind the Town Hall. Fireworks have been a recent addition to the festival. There are rides and a carnival mid-way along with food, musical performances, a lawn tractor pull, woodsman competition pony rides and the chicken BBQ.
The name was given to it because they set up squares on the field behind the town hall.  They place cows out on the enclosed squares.  People then place bets on the square that they believe will be defecated on first by one of the cows.

Parks and recreation

Sweets Knoll State Park is a fifty-six acre park located in Dighton. It was purchased in June 2009, and includes two miles of old railroad bed which may be adapted into a walking and biking path, picnic areas, a small boat launch, and fishing.

Tricentennial Park, a small waterfront park along the Taunton River, was created as an Eagle Scout project by a young resident in honor of the town's tricentennial in 2012.

Government
Dighton is governed by an open town meeting led by a board of selectmen. Currently serving on the Board of Selectmen are: Leonard Hull (Chairman), Peter Caron (Clerk), and Kenneth Pacheco. The town has a central police station along Route 138 by the banks of the Segreganset River, separate post offices and fire departments near the center of town and North Dighton, and the Dighton Public Library at the center of town.  Dighton has a conservation area and a small park next to the town hall near the intersection of Center Street and Route 138.

Dighton is located in the Fifth Bristol state representative district, which includes Somerset and parts of Swansea and Taunton.  The town is represented in the state senate in the First Plymouth and Bristol district, which includes the towns of Berkley, Bridgewater, Carver, Marion, Middleborough, Raynham, Taunton and Wareham. Dighton is patrolled by the Middleboro Barracks (D4) of the Massachusetts State Police.  On the national level, the town is part of Massachusetts Congressional District 4, which is represented by Joe Kennedy.  The state's junior (Class I) Senator is Ed Markey and the state's senior (Class II) Senator is Elizabeth Warren.

Education

Dighton and its neighboring town Rehoboth comprise one school district, the Dighton-Rehoboth School District. It was founded in 1987 to oversee the schools of both towns. The high school, Dighton-Rehoboth Regional High School, was founded in 1958 to serve both towns. The school itself is located in North Dighton, mere yards away from the Rehoboth town line.  Its athletics teams are known as the Falcons, and its colors are green and gold. The Dighton Middle and Elementary Schools are located near the corner of Center Street and Somerset Avenue (Route 138) at the center of town.

The town is also the home of Bristol County Agricultural High School. The school operates a large farm along the banks of the Taunton River at its Center Street location. The town does not have any affiliation with a regional vocational school system, the closest one being Bristol-Plymouth Regional Technical School, located in Taunton, Massachusetts.

Library

Dighton is served by the Dighton Public Library. As of December 2009, the Library Director was Jocelyn Tavares.

Historic places

 Coram Shipyard Historic District
 Dighton Wharves Historic District
 Dighton Community Church, 1798

Notable people

 Thomas Coram (1668–1751), Lived in Dighton for ten years and founded the Coram Shipyard
 Ralph Moody (1917–2004), American race car driver and engineer. Founder of Holman-Moody of NASCAR and LeMans fame in the 1960s
 Samuel Shaw (1768–1827), United States Representative from Vermont
 Jesse Talbot (1805–1879), Hudson River School painter, Associate Member of the National Academy of Design, and friend to Walt Whitman
 Silas Talbot (1751–1813), U.S. Navy Commodore, Representative of New York's 10th district, and captain of the USS Constitution
 Ruth Tripp (1897–1971), composer; administered the Works Project Administration's Federal Music Project in Rhode Island

See also 
 Cole River
 Greater Taunton Area
 Taunton River Watershed

References

External links

 
 Town of Dighton official website
 Dighton.com, community website
 City-Data.com
 ePodunk: Profile for Dighton Massachusetts 

 
Towns in Bristol County, Massachusetts
Greater Taunton Area
Providence metropolitan area
Towns in Massachusetts